Piz d'Err is a mountain of the Albula Alps, overlooking Mulegns in the canton of Graubünden. It lies 1 km north of Piz Calderas.

References

External links

 Piz d'Err on Hikr
 Piz d'Err on Summitpost

Mountains of Graubünden
Mountains of the Alps
Alpine three-thousanders
Mountains of Switzerland
Surses